William Kirkbride (birth registered first ¼ 1944) is an English former professional rugby league footballer who played in the 1960s, 1970s and 1980s, and coached in the 1970s and 1980s.

Background
Kirkbride's birth was registered in Workington, Cumberland, England.

Playing career

County honours
Kirkbride won caps for Cumberland while at Workington Town making his début against Lancashire at Derwent Park in 1967, playing in the 17-15 victory over Australia at Derwent Park in 1967, and while at Castleford playing left-, i.e. number 11, in the 3-42 defeat by Yorkshire at Hull Kingston Rovers' stadium on 1 October 1969, and Left- in the 15-21 defeat by Yorkshire at Whitehaven's stadium on 14 September 1970.

Club career
Kirkbride made his début for Workington Town playing  alongside fellow Cumbrian Frank Foster in the 11-10 victory over Widnes at Naughton Park in the last game of the 1963–64 season on Tuesday 12 May 1964, he joined Halifax in 1968 for a fee of £6,000 (based on increases in average earnings, this would be approximately £165,900 in 2013), he made his début for Halifax against Leigh Miners Welfare in the Challenge Cup on Saturday 3 February 1968, he joined Castleford in 1969 for a fee of £5,750, he joined Salford in 1971 for a fee of £6,000.

Challenge Cup Final appearances
Kirkbride played left-, i.e. number 11, and was man of the match winning the Lance Todd Trophy in Castleford's 7-2 victory over Wigan in the 1970 Challenge Cup final at Wembley Stadium, London during the 1969–70 season on Saturday 9 May 1970, in front of a crowd of 95,255.

Players No.6 Trophy Final appearances
Kirkbride played right-, i.e. number 12, in Salford's 7-12 defeat by Leeds in the 1972–73 Players No.6 Trophy final at Fartown Ground, Huddersfield on Saturday 24 March 1973.

Coaching career

Challenge Cup Final 
Kirkbride was the coach in Wakefield Trinity's 3-12 defeat by Widnes in the 1979 Challenge Cup Final during the 1978–79 season at Wembley Stadium, London on Saturday 5 May 1979, in front of a crowd of a crowd of 94,218.

Rugby Football League Championship Second Division
Kirkbride was the coach in York's victory in the 1980–81 Championship Second Division.

Honoured at Castleford Tigers
Kirkbride is a Tigers Hall Of Fame Inductee.

References

External links
Former Wire Greats Return For Centenary
Lance Todd Winner: I Owe My Career To Brian

1944 births
Living people
Castleford Tigers players
Cumberland rugby league team players
English rugby league coaches
English rugby league players
Halifax R.L.F.C. players
Lance Todd Trophy winners
Leigh Leopards players
Rochdale Hornets coaches
Rochdale Hornets players
Rugby league players from Workington
Rugby league props
Rugby league second-rows
Salford Red Devils players
Souths Logan Magpies players
Wakefield Trinity coaches
Wakefield Trinity players
Workington Town players
York Wasps coaches
York Wasps players